Abel Antón Rodrigo (born 24 October 1962 in Ojuel, municipality of Cabrejas del Campo, Soria) is a Spanish long-distance runner. He won gold medals in the marathon at the 1997 and the 1999 World Championships in Athletics. In 1998 Antón became the first Spanish runner to win the London Marathon. He also won the Berlin Marathon in 1996, giving him major marathon championships in 4 consecutive years (1996 through 1999.)

In 2006 Abel Anton was implicated by Spanish professional cyclist and whistleblower Jesús Manzano in the doping ring that was the focus of the Operación Puerto doping investigation by the Spanish Guardia Civil. Manzano alleged that Abel Anton together with former 5,000-metre champion Alberto García and Spanish 1,500-metre athlete Reyes Estévez were in a hotel where Eufemiano Fuentes, the Spanish sports doctor at the centre of the alleged doping ring, was claimed to have been offering consultations. Manzano went on to declare, in an interview with Italian online cycling journal Tuttobiciweb, that these athletes were all "with Fuentes". Alberto Garcia later served a two-year ban after having tested positive for EPO in 2003.

References

External links

 
 
 
 

1962 births
Living people
Olympic athletes of Spain
Spanish male long-distance runners
Spanish male marathon runners
Athletes (track and field) at the 1988 Summer Olympics
Athletes (track and field) at the 1992 Summer Olympics
Athletes (track and field) at the 1996 Summer Olympics
Athletes (track and field) at the 2000 Summer Olympics
London Marathon male winners
World Athletics Championships medalists
European Athletics Championships medalists
Berlin Marathon male winners
Recipients of the Association of International Marathons and Distance Races Best Marathon Runner Award
Mediterranean Games bronze medalists for Spain
Mediterranean Games medalists in athletics
Athletes (track and field) at the 1987 Mediterranean Games
World Athletics Championships winners